Rigorous coupled-wave analysis (RCWA) is a semi-analytical method in computational electromagnetics that is most typically applied to solve scattering from periodic dielectric structures.  It is a Fourier-space method so devices and fields are represented as a sum of spatial harmonics.

Floquet's theorem
The method is based on Floquet's theorem that the solutions of periodic differential equations can be expanded with Floquet functions (or sometimes referred as Bloch wave, especially in solid-state physics community).  A device is divided into layers that are each uniform in the z direction.  A staircase approximation is needed for curved devices with properties such as dielectric permittivity graded along the z-direction.  The electromagnetic modes in each layer are calculated and analytically propagated through the layers.  The overall problem is solved by matching boundary conditions at each of the interfaces between the layers using a technique like scattering matrices.  To solve for the electromagnetic modes, which are decided by the wave vector of the incident plane wave, in periodic dielectric medium, the Maxwell's equations (in partial differential form) as well as the boundary conditions are expanded by the Floquet functions and turned into infinitely large algebraic equations. With the cutting off of higher order Floquet functions, depending on the accuracy and convergence speed one needs, the infinitely large algebraic equations become finite and thus solvable by computers.

Fourier factorization
Being a Fourier-space method it suffers several drawbacks.  Gibbs phenomenon is particularly severe for devices with high dielectric contrast.  Truncating the number of spatial harmonics can also slow convergence and techniques like fast Fourier factorization (FFF) should be used.  FFF is straightforward to implement for 1D gratings, but the community is still working on a straightforward approach for crossed grating devices.  The difficulty with FFF in crossed grating devices is that the field must be decomposed into parallel and perpendicular components at all of the interfaces.  This is not a straightforward calculation for arbitrarily shaped devices.

Boundary conditions
Boundary conditions must be enforced at the interfaces between all the layers.  When many layers are used, this becomes too large to solve simultaneously.  Instead, we borrow from network theory and calculate scattering matrices.  This lets us solve the boundary conditions one layer at a time.  Almost without exception, however, the scattering matrices implemented for RCWA are inefficient and do not follow long standing conventions in terms of how S11, S12, S21, and S22 are defined.    Other methods exist like the enhanced transmittance matrices (ETM), R matrices, H matrices, and probably more.  ETM, for example, is considerably faster but less memory efficient.

Applications
RCWA analysis applied to a polarized broadband reflectometry measurement is used within the semiconductor power device industry as a measurement technique to obtain detailed profile information of periodic trench structures. This technique has been used to provide trench depth and critical dimension (CD) results comparable to cross-section SEM, while having the added benefit of being both high-throughput and non-destructive.

In order to extract critical dimensions of a trench structure (depth, CD, and sidewall angle), the measured polarized reflectance data must have a sufficiently large wavelength range and analyzed with a physically valid model (for example: RCWA in combination with the Forouhi-Bloomer Dispersion relations for n and k). Studies have shown that the limited wavelength range of a standard reflectometer (375 - 750 nm) does not provide the sensitivity to accurately measure trench structures with small CD values (less than 200 nm). However, by using a reflectometer with the wavelength range extended from 190 - 1000 nm, it is possible to accurately measure these smaller structures.

RCWA is also used to improve diffractive structures for high efficiency solar cells. For the simulation of the whole solar cell or solar module, RCWA can be efficiently combined with the OPTOS formalism.

References 

See Chapter 6 in Design and Optimization of Nano-Optical Elements by Coupling Fabrication to Optical Behavior

External links 
 RODIS
 EMpy
 MRCWA
 S4
 Unigit (RCWA, Rayleigh–Fourier & C-method)
 RawDog

Mathematical physics
Computational electromagnetics
Fourier analysis
Holography